Zhihengliuella is a genus of gram-positive, mesophilic, aerobic non-spore-forming and motile bacteria from the family Micrococcaceae. Zhihengliuella is named after the Chinese microbiologist Zhi-Heng Liu.

References

Further reading 
 
 

Micrococcaceae
Bacteria genera